Kalyan Vidhan Sabha Seat no longer exists, after the redrawing of assembly constituency borders in 2008. It was one of the 288 assembly seats in Maharashtra state in India. Since 2008, Kalyan is awarded 3 assembly seats : Kalyan East, Kalyan West, Kalyan Rural.

Assembly Members
 1972: Nakul Patil (Congress) 
 1978: Ram Kapse (BJP)
 2004: Harishchandra Patil (BJP)
 From 2008 : Seat does not exist. See Kalyan East Assembly constituency, et al

Election Results

1972 Election
 Nakul Pundlik Patil (INC) : 40,048 votes 
 Ramchandra Ganesh Kapse (BJS) : 20,171

1978 Election
 Kapse, Ramchandra Ganesh (BJP) : 39,066 votes 
 Pande Akhilesh Narayan (INC(I)) : 27,071

2004 Election
 Harishchandra Patil (BJP) : 110,752 votes 
 Alka Avalaskar (INC) : 92,491

See also 
 List of constituencies of Maharashtra Legislative Assembly

References

Assembly constituencies of Maharashtra